Florence Timponi Jennings (August 9, 1896 – January 21, 1991), born Florence Lucille Timpone, also known as Melva Talma, was an American singer, actress, Ziegfeld girl, and vaudeville performer, billed as "the Sunshine Girl".

Early life 
Timpone was born in New York City, the daughter of Dominick Timpone and Mary Albro Timpone. Her father was born in Italy.

Career 
Timponi was a singer, especially in vaudeville shows. Variety magazine commented on her "fair personality and nice appearance" in 1914. She was billed as "the Sunshine Girl". During World War I, she sang at the 52nd Street Naval Armory in Brooklyn, and at Bensonhurst. She performed novelty songs about American troops fighting Germans. Her photo was featured on sheet music for some of her popular numbers, including Irving Berlin's "Oh! How I Hate to Get Up in the Morning" (1918) "You're a Great Big Blue-Eyed Baby" (1913), and "We'll knock the Heligo--Into Heligo--out of Heligoland!". She also collected clothing, canes, gloves, suitcases and leather, donated by her audiences, for reuse in the war effort. Her stage credits included roles in School Days  and Little Simplicity.

In the 1920s, she performed as "Melva Talma", still singing novelty songs and still billed as "the Sunshine Girl." She sang in vaudeville programs in Canada in 1925.

Personal life 
Florence Timpone married George Washington Jennings in 1928. They had a daughter, Georgia Ann. George Jennings died in 1970, and Florence Jennings died in 1991, in Santa Monica, California, aged 94 years.

References

External links 

 "Tie Me to Your Apron Strings Again" (1925), sheet music featuring a photo of Melva Talma, from the Sheet Music Collection at Mississippi State University

1896 births
1991 deaths
American singers
Vaudeville performers
American women in World War I
American people of Italian descent